This is a list of diplomatic missions of Tuvalu. Tuvalu has a population of 12,100, making it the second least populated independent country in the world, ahead of the Vatican (900).  It consequently cannot support anything but the barest diplomatic network.

General Aspects

Tuvalu has only five diplomatic missions abroad: a High Commission in Suva, Fiji, (opened in 1976), its office at the United Nations (opened in 2001), an embassy in Brussels, Belgium, home city of the European Union headquarters (opened in 2008), an embassy in the Republic of China (opened in March 2013) and a High Commission in Wellington, New Zealand (opened in February 2015).

Tuvalu also has honorary consulates in Sydney (Australia), Tokyo (Japan), Kaohsiung (Republic of China), Basel (Switzerland), Singapore, Hamburg (Germany), Seoul (South Korea) and in the Tuvalu House in London (United Kingdom).

Asia

 Taipei (Embassy)

 Abu Dhabi (Embassy)

Europe

 Brussels (Embassy)

Oceania

 Suva (High Commission)

 Wellington (High Commission)

Multilateral organisations
 Brussels (Permanent delegation to the European Union)
 New York City (Permanent delegation to the United Nations)

Permanent Representative of Tuvalu to the United Nations

 Enele Sopoaga (3 July 2001  to 2006)  
 Afelee F. Pita (19 December 2006 to December 2012)
 Aunese Simati (20 December 2012 to July 2017)
 Ambassador Samuelu Laloniu is the current permanent representative to the United Nations. He took up his post on 21 July 2017. He also presented his credentials as Tuvalu's ambassador to the United States on 21 July 2017.

Sources and references

See also

 Foreign relations of Tuvalu
 List of diplomatic missions in Tuvalu

 
Diplomatic missions
Tuvalu